Setting may refer to:
 A location (geography) where something is set
 Set construction in theatrical scenery
 Setting (narrative), the place and time in a work of narrative, especially fiction
 Setting up to fail a manipulative technique to engineer failure
 Stonesetting, in jewelry, when a diamond or gem is set into a frame or bed
 Campaign setting in role playing play
 In computers and electronics, the computer configuration or options of the software or device
Settings (Windows)
 Typesetting
 Set and setting, the context for psychedelic drug experiences
 Setting (knot), the tightening of a knot
 Musical setting, the composition of music for an existing text, usually in choral music

Education
 Ability grouping, small groups formed within a single classroom
 Tracking (education), also called streaming, separating pupils by academic ability into groups for all subjects within a school
 The location where the education takes place, for example the classroom, known as the educational setting

See also
 Set (disambiguation)
 Setup (disambiguation)